Nonna Debonne (born 5 March 1985) is a French football defender currently playing for GPSO 92 Issy in the Division 1 Féminine. She has spent much of her career playing for Paris Saint-Germain.

She has played two matches for the French national team.

Club statistics
As of 1 September 2016

References

External links

 Player stats at footofeminin.fr 
 
 

1985 births
Living people
French women's footballers
France women's international footballers
CNFE Clairefontaine players
Paris Saint-Germain Féminine players
Footballers from Le Mans
Division 1 Féminine players
Women's association football defenders
GPSO 92 Issy players